Abdoul Karim Cissé (born 20 October 1985) is an Ivorian professional footballer who plays as a goalkeeper for SC Gagnoa and the Ivory Coast national football team.

Career
Cissé was named the best player of the month for the Association des Footballeurs Ivoiriens in March 2015.

International career
In order to finish third in 2016 African Nations Championship, Cissé made two penalty saves to deny Guinea a facile early lead.

Honours
 1x Association des Footballeurs Ivoiriens Player of the Month

References

Ivorian footballers
Ivory Coast international footballers
Association football goalkeepers
Living people
1985 births
Ivory Coast A' international footballers
2009 African Nations Championship players
Footballers from Abidjan
2011 African Nations Championship players
2016 African Nations Championship players
2018 African Nations Championship players